Cannabis in Bolivia is illegal, but cultivated illicitly, mostly for domestic consumption. Bolivia's Anti-Drug Law 1008 of 1988 mandates rehabilitation and treatment for drug users.

References

Bolivia
Drugs in Bolivia
Bolivia
Bolivia